The 2016 Copa do Brasil First Round was played from 16 March to 25 May 2016, deciding the 40 teams that advanced to the Second Round.

Matches
The first legs will be played from 16 March to 27 April, and the second legs will be played from 6 April to 25 May.

|}

Match 1

Santos won 4–1 on aggregate.

Match 2

Galvez won 2–1 on aggregate.

Match 3

ABC won 4–3 on aggregate.

Match 4

Tied 3–3 on aggregate, Gama won on away goals.

Match 5

Tied 3–3 on aggregate, Ríver won on penalties.

Match 6

Tied 2–2 on aggregate, Botafogo won on penalties.

Match 7

Tied 3–3 on aggregate, Ceará won on away goals.

Match 8

Joinville won 2–1 on aggregate.

Match 9

Vasco da Gama won 3–1 on aggregate.

Match 10

CRB advanced directly due to winning by 2 or more goals difference.

Match 11

Tied 1–1 on aggregate, Vitória da Conquista won on away goals.

Match 12

Santa Cruz won 1–0 on aggregate.

Match 13

Cruzeiro won 3–2 on aggregate.

Match 14

Londrina won 7–0 on aggregate.

Match 15

Vitória won 6–3 on aggregate.

Match 16

Tied 2–2 on aggregate, Portuguesa won on away goals.

Match 17

Coritiba advanced directly due to winning by 2 or more goals difference.

Match 18

Juventude won 3–1 on aggregate.

Match 19

Operário won 3–2 on aggregate.

Match 20

Paysandu won 4–1 on aggregate.

Match 21

Atlético Paranaense won 2–1 on aggregate.

Match 22

Dom Bosco won 3–1 on aggregate.

Match 23

Chapecoense won 4–1 on aggregate.

Match 24

Paraná won 3–1 on aggregate.

Match 25

Flamengo won 3–1 on aggregate.

Match 26

Fortaleza won 3–1 on aggregate.

Match 27

Bahia won 3–1 on aggregate.

Match 28

América Mineiro won 4–3 on aggregate.

Match 29

Fluminense advanced directly due to winning by 2 or more goals difference.

Match 30

Ferroviária won 2–1 on aggregate.

Match 31

Aparecidense won 4–1 on aggregate.

Match 32

Ypiranga won 4–2 on aggregate.

Match 33

Figueirense advanced directly due to winning by 2 or more goals difference.

Match 34

Tied 2–2 on aggregate, Sampaio Corrêa won on away goals.

Match 35

Ponte Preta won 3–2 on aggregate.

Match 36

Gênus won 3–2 on aggregate.

Match 37

Botafogo won 2–1 on aggregate.

Match 38

Tied 1–1 on aggregate, Juazeirense won on penalties.

Match 39

Avaí won 2–1 on aggregate.

Match 40

Bragantino advanced directly due to winning by 2 or more goals difference.

References

2016 Copa do Brasil